The 2000 Oregon State Beavers football team represented Oregon State University in the Pacific-10 Conference (Pac-10) during the 2000 NCAA Division I-A football season. The Beavers played their home games on campus at Reser Stadium in Corvallis and were led by second-year head coach Dennis Erickson.

The 2000 season was arguably the greatest season in OSU's football history. They finished the regular season at 10–1 (7–1 in Pac-10), to share the league title with Washington and Oregon–their first conference title since 1964. The three-point loss at Washington in early October kept the Beavers out of the Rose Bowl and their first outright conference title since 1956. They routed tenth-ranked Notre Dame 41–9 in the Fiesta Bowl, and the eleven wins remains an Oregon State record.

Schedule

Roster

Rankings

Game summaries

Eastern Washington

Source: Box Score

at New Mexico

San Diego State

USC

Source: Box Score

at Washington

Source: Box Score

Stanford

at UCLA

Washington State

at California

at Arizona

Oregon

Source: Box Score

vs. Notre Dame (Fiesta Bowl)

Source: Box Score

Team players in the 2001 NFL Draft

References

Oregon State
Oregon State Beavers football seasons
Pac-12 Conference football champion seasons
Fiesta Bowl champion seasons
Oregon State Beavers football